Linby (Great Northern Railway) was a railway station on the Great Northern Railway's Nottingham to Shirebrook line.

History

Present day 
No trace of the station remains. The site is now a footpath but a possible railway building does survive in private ownership.

References

Disused railway stations in Nottinghamshire
Railway stations in Great Britain opened in 1882
Railway stations in Great Britain closed in 1931
Former Great Northern Railway stations
Ashfield District